Karmøy-Posten was a Norwegian newspaper, published in Karmøy in Rogaland county.

Karmøy-Posten was started in 1911. In 1939 it was absorbed by Haugesund-based newspaper Haugesunds Dagblad.

References

1911 establishments in Norway
1939 disestablishments in Norway
Defunct newspapers published in Norway
Mass media in Karmøy
Norwegian-language newspapers
Newspapers established in 1911
Publications disestablished in 1939